Rafi's Revenge is a 1998 studio album by Asian Dub Foundation. It peaked at number 20 on the UK Albums Chart. It was shortlisted for the 1998 Mercury Music Prize.

Critical reception

Rick Anderson of AllMusic called Rafi's Revenge "an exhausting but exhilarating album," adding that "its depth and complexity of texture keep revealing new surprises with repeated listenings." Matt Diehl of Entertainment Weekly wrote, "Recalling the Clash in their dance-music phase or a more groovealicious Rage Against the Machine, Asian Dub Foundation kick out the jams in Rafi's Revenge with aplomb; in the process, they become more than a caustic Cornershop for club kids."

Track listing

Personnel
Credits adapted from liner notes.

Asian Dub Foundation
 Deeder – vocals, programming
 Chandrasonic – vocals, guitar, programming
 Dr Das – vocals, bass guitar, programming
 Pandit G – sampler, turntables
 Sun-J – synthesizer, MIDI

Additional musicians
 Navigator – vocals (9)
 Catalisa – vocals (3, 5)
 Ysanne – violin (8)

Charts

References

External links
 

1998 albums
Asian Dub Foundation albums
FFRR Records albums
London Records albums
Slash Records albums